The Kohala Hydropower Project is a proposed run-of-the-river, high head project of 316 meters that will be located near Kohala, in Azad Kashmir. In 2020 the project's agreement was finalised later it was formally signed in a ceremony attended by the Pakistani Prime Minister Imran khan, and Chinese ambassador.

Location 
The diversion dam site is on Jhelum River near Sarran Village 40 km upstream from Muzaffarabad and a 20 km long tunnel connects to the powerhouse which is located at Barsala 7 km upstream from Kohala Bridge.

Background
China Three Gorges Corporation (CTGC), the state-owned hydropower developer, won the right to develop a hydroelectric dam in Pakistan on January 7, 2015. The Kohala Hydropower Project will be CTGC's largest investment in Pakistan.

In December 2018  the people of Muzaffarabad held protests against Kohala dam design due to its planned water diversion via tunnel which will bypass the Muzaffarabad city.

Design
The dam's feasibility study and detailed engineering designs were performed by SMEC. The Kohala hydroelectric scheme will have a gravity, roller-concrete compacted dam on the upper branch of the Jhelum, 40 km from Muzaffarabad. The powerhouse, on the lower branch of the Jhelum near Barasala, will house four 281-MW Pelton turbines.

Tariffs
CWE is required to construct the project on a build, own, operate and transfer basis. In 2014, local published reports said the average tariff for the first 12 years was set at 8.9 cents per unit and during the following 18 years would be 5.1 cents per unit. The average tariff for the 30-year life of the project is 7.9 cents per unit. The tariff ensures 17 per cent return on equity on internal rate of return basis.

Carbon credit
The project is expected to earn carbon credit from the United Nations Framework Convention on Climate Change for clean energy development under the Kyoto protocol.

See also 

 List of dams and reservoirs in Pakistan
 List of power stations in Pakistan
 Azad Pattan Hydropower Project
 Duber Khwar hydropower project
 Gomal Zam Dam
 Gulpur Hydropower Project
 Karot Hydropower Project
 Khan Khwar Hydropower Project
 New Bong Escape Hydropower Project
 Patrind Hydropower Plant
 Satpara Dam

References 

Hydroelectric power stations in Pakistan
Dams in Pakistan
Dams on the Jhelum River
Run-of-the-river power stations
Proposed hydroelectric power stations
Muzaffarabad District
Roller-compacted concrete dams
Proposed renewable energy power stations in Pakistan